"Prends ma vie" is a song by French singer Johnny Hallyday. In 1974 it was first released as a single and then on the studio album Je t'aime, je t'aime, je t'aime.

Composition and writing 
The song was written by Michel Mallory and Jean Renard. The recording was produced by Jean Renard.

Commercial performance 
In France the single spent three weeks at no. 1 on the singles sales chart (in March–April 1974).

Track listing 
7" single Philips 6009 478 (1974, France)
 Side 1. "Prends ma vie" (3:03)
 Side 2. "Trop belle trop jolie" (3:33)

Charts

References

External links 
 Johnny Hallyday – "Prends ma vie" (single) at Discogs

1974 songs
1974 singles
Johnny Hallyday songs
Philips Records singles
Number-one singles in France
Songs written by Jean Renard (songwriter)
Songs written by Michel Mallory